Avec Laudenum is the fifth studio LP released by Stars of the Lid. It was originally released on Sub Rosa in 1999 and then re-released on Chicago indie Kranky in late 2002. The title translates as "With Laudanum", laudanum being an opiate. The first three tracks are three sections of one long piece but, while within the minimalist vein, they have some variation and movement.  The final two, individual tracks are more minimalist than the former and create a "floating bliss" atmosphere.  By the time of this recording, band members Adam Wiltzie and Brian McBride were residing in Brussels, Belgium, and Los Angeles, California, respectively.  It is reported that a vast proportion of this album was recorded through mail, with ideas being sent back and forth between the duo.

Critical reception

The album was generally praised by critics. John Bush, writing for AllMusic, stated:

Track listing
"The Atomium, Part One" – 5:32
"The Atomium, Part Two" – 10:43
"The Atomium, Part Three" – 6:17
"Dust Breeding (1.316)+" – 9:08
"I Will Surround You" – 10:28

References

1999 albums
Stars of the Lid albums
Kranky albums
Instrumental albums